Elmont, also referred to as Elmont–UBS Arena, is a Long Island Rail Road (LIRR) station on the border of Elmont and Bellerose Terrace in Nassau County, New York, just east of the New York City borough of Queens. It serves the LIRR Main Line and is being developed as part of the redevelopment of Belmont Park, which includes the new UBS Arena for the New York Islanders of the National Hockey League. The station opened for eastbound service in November 2021 and westbound service in October 2022.

History 

Plans for the station were first announced in July 2019 by then-New York governor Andrew Cuomo. New York Arena Partners, the main party behind the Belmont Park redevelopment, will pay $97 million of the estimated $105 million cost, with the balance being paid by the state. The eastbound platform opened on November 20, 2021. The westbound platform is set to open in  late 2022. When completed, it will be the first completely new LIRR station since 1976, when the now-dismantled Southampton Campus station opened. It currently is served by eastbound Hempstead Branch trains on event days only; full-time service is expected to begin after the westbound platform is completed in 2022.

The project is seen as vital to the Belmont Park redevelopment. Though the Elmont station will serve a portion of Elmont that does not currently have full-time train service, opponents of UBS Arena have claimed that the station plans conceal the real motivation behind building the arena.

The LIRR anticipates that the new Elmont station would not be expected to generate new commuter ridership but would instead result in a shift of existing riders living in Bellerose Terrace and Elmont that currently use other stations. With the operation of the Elmont station, existing levels of commuter service would be maintained to other LIRR stations (e.g., Queens Village, Bellerose, Floral Park) and the addition of the Elmont station would not be anticipated to result in an impact to commuter service.

On November 20, 2021, the eastbound platform opened for the Islanders' first game at UBS Arena that night. While construction of the westbound platform continued, customers were required to use free shuttle buses or walk to UBS Arena or Belmont Park station until the westbound platform opened the following year. The westbound platform officially opened on October 6, 2022, for the Islanders–Devils preseason game that night.

On February 8, 2023, the LIRR announced that Elmont station would be served by trains from the Ronkonkoma Branch and Port Jefferson Branch as far as Huntington, with limited service during peak hours and most trains stopping during weekday evening or weekend hours.

Station layout

This station has two 12-car-long side platforms, both of which are compliant with the Americans with Disabilities Act of 1990. Unlike the Belmont Park station directly to the south, it is able to serve Main Line trains from both the west and east. The station also includes platform canopies, LED signs, benches, USB charging ports, bike racks, and art. 

The station is located directly east of (and partially over) the overpass across the Cross Island Parkway. The location of the station gives platform access on the Bellerose Terrace side via an overpass.

References

Long Island Rail Road stations in Nassau County, New York
Long Island Rail Road stations in New York City
Railway stations in Nassau County, New York
Railway stations in Queens, New York
Railway stations in the United States opened in 2021